Rideau Cottage is an historic residential building located on the grounds of Rideau Hall in Ottawa, Ontario. The two-level, 22-room Georgian Revival home is owned by the Canadian Crown and has traditionally been inhabited by people associated with the governor general of Canada, including the viceroy's private secretary. It has been occupied by Prime Minister Justin Trudeau and his family in lieu of 24 Sussex Drive since 2015.

History
Construction on the building, which was based on a design by architect F. P. Rubidge, began in 1866 and concluded in 1867. Though intended in the early days to serve as the residence of the governor general's secretary, the cottage was later designated for use by the government as an official guest house for visiting dignitaries.

On his arrival in Canada in 1883, incoming governor general the Marquess of Lansdowne resided at Rideau Cottage while waiting for Rideau Hall to be vacated by the outgoing governor general, the Marquess of Lorne. Other residents included: Lionel and Lilias Massey during Vincent Massey's time as governor general; Georges Vanier, as Aide-de-camp to Governor General Byng; Barbara Uteck, private secretary to the governor general from 2000 to 2006, and her husband, Graham Fraser. Uteck's successor Sheila-Marie Cook, resided at Rideau Cottage from 2006 until January 31, 2011. The house was then occupied by private secretary Stephen Wallace, until the weekend of 24–25 October 2015, when he vacated the premises to allow then prime minister-designate Justin Trudeau and his family to live in the house while the traditional official residence of the prime minister of Canada, 24 Sussex Drive, was undergoing assessment for repairs and restoration.

Rideau Cottage was designated a Recognized Federal Heritage Building on 3 October 1986.

Design
Rideau Cottage is a two-level, 22-room Georgian Revival building. Originally, the structure had 14 rooms on a single floor. An 1872 remodel, using a different brick, added both the second level and a verandah on three sides of the ground floor. During that remodel, the exterior brick of the first floor was covered in stucco painted to appear like brick. (When the verandah was removed some time later, the stucco remained.) Between 1999 and 2000, the building underwent major renovations to the basement, roof and interior finishes, and the mechanical and electrical systems were upgraded. Outside, the stucco was removed and each brick and joint was individually dyed to give a uniform appearance. It was again renovated in 2013.

Rideau Cottage is characterized and distinguished by its symmetry, simple lines, classically inspired central entrance with pedimented porch, sash windows flanked by decorative shutters, and paired chimneys.

References

Buildings and structures on the National Historic Sites of Canada register
Houses completed in 1867
Federal government buildings in Ottawa
Official residences in Canada
Monarchy in Canada
Houses in Ottawa
Government Houses of the British Empire and Commonwealth
Heritage sites in Ontario
1867 establishments in Ontario